The Mechums River is a  tributary of the South Fork of the Rivanna River in central Virginia in the United States.  Via the Rivanna and James rivers, it is part of the watershed of Chesapeake Bay.

Course
The Mechums River rises in northern Nelson County and flows for the remainder of its course in northwestern Albemarle County.

See also
List of Virginia rivers

Sources

DeLorme (2005).  Virginia Atlas & Gazetteer.  Yarmouth, Maine: DeLorme.  .

Rivers of Virginia
Tributaries of the James River
Rivers of Albemarle County, Virginia
Rivers of Nelson County, Virginia